Anglia (German and Low German: Angeln; Danish and South Jutlandic: Angel) is a small peninsula on the eastern coast of Jutland (the Cimbric Peninsula).  Jutland consists of the mainland of Denmark and the northernmost German state of Schleswig-Holstein. Anglia belongs to the region of Southern Schleswig, which constitutes the northern part of Schleswig-Holstein, and protrudes into the Bay of Kiel of the Baltic Sea. 

To the south, Anglia is separated from the neighbouring peninsula of Swania (Ger. Schwansen, Dan. Svans or Svansø) by the Sly Firth (Ger. Schlei, Dan. Sli), and to the north from the Danish peninsula of Sundeved (Ger. Sundewitt) and the Danish island of Als (Ger. Alsen) by the Flensburg Firth (Ger. Flensburger Förde, Dan. Flensborg Fjord). The landscape is hilly, dotted with numerous lakes. Whether ancient Anglia conformed to the borders of the Anglian Peninsula is uncertain. It may have been somewhat larger; however, the ancient sources mainly concur that it also included the peninsula's territory.

Anglia has a significance far beyond its current small area and country terrain, in that it is believed to have been the original home of the Angles, Germanic settlers in East Anglia, Central and Northern England, and the Eastern Scottish Lowlands. Their migration led to their new homeland being named after them, from which the name "England" derives. England, East, Mid and West Anglia as well as the English language, thus, ultimately derive at least their names from Anglia.

Glücksburg Castle in Glücksburg in the north of Anglia, is the seat of the House of Schleswig-Holstein-Sonderburg-Glücksburg, of which the king of the United Kingdom is a patrilineal member.

Terminology
The German word Angeln has been hypothesised to originate from the Germanic Proto-Indo-European root , meaning "narrow", meaning here "the Narrow [Water]", i.e. the Sly Firth; the root would be , "tight" (compare Ger. and Dutch eng = "narrow", "England" = Ger. England, "narrow land" = Ger. enges Land). 

The "-n"-ending is the most common ending for geographical regions in German, comparable to the English endings "-ia" and "-y": "Croatia" = Kroatien, "Italy" = Italien.

In German, the word Angeln has three other meanings: as a verb, angeln means "to angle". It is written with a capitalized initial letter in its nominalized form: das Angeln (n) = "(the) angling" (compare "(the) fishing" = das Fischen (n) or die Fischerei (f)).

When used with the plural article, Angeln means "fishing rods": die Angel (long form: die Angelrute) (f) = "the fishing rod", die Angeln (die Angelruten) (p) = "the fishing rods".

Finally, the term Angeln also refers to the people of the Angles: die Angeln (p) = "the Angles", while Eng. "the angel" = Ger. der Engel (m), "the angle" = der Winkel (m), "the angler" = der Angler (m), and "the fisherman" = der Fischer (m).

There is also a theory that Angeln meant "hook" (as in angling for fish), in reference to the shape of the peninsula. Compare Old Norse ǫngull and Modern Nynorsk angel or ongel, with the meaning (fish) hook, cognate with English angle.

Linguist Julius Pokorny derived it from the Proto-Indo-European root *ang-, "bend" (see ankle). 

It is also possible that the Angles may have been called such because they were a fishing people or were originally descended from such.

Geography 

Together with Swania (Ger. Schwansen, Dan. Svans or Svansø), Danish Wahld (Ger. Dänischer Wohld, Dan. Jernved) and Wagria (Ger. Wagrien, Dan. Vagrien), Anglia is one of four peninsulas along the Baltic Sea coast of the northernmost German federal state of Schleswig-Holstein. 
As part of the Schleswig-Holstein Morainic Uplands (Ger. Schleswig-Holsteinisches Moränenhügelland), that were formed during the Weichselian glaciation, these peninsulas are hilly and dotted with several glacial lakes. The Anglian glacial lakes form the North Anglian Lake Group (Ger. Nordangeliter Seengruppe). The River Treene (Dan. Trenen) with its main headstream Bondenau (Dan. Bondeåen) rises in Anglia. Although rising on the Anglian Peninsula in the Baltic Sea, the Treene flows towards the North Sea, being the main tributary of the River Eider (Dan. Ejderen), the river that constituted the Southern border of the Danish Realm for a very long time. The northernmost part of Anglia is formed by the Holnis (Dan. Holnæs) Peninsula that protrudes into the Flensburg Firth.

Apart from Flensburg, which is an independent town, the Anglian Peninsula belongs to the district of Schleswig-Flensburg (Dan. Slesvig-Flensborg), Germany's northeasternmost district (seat: Schleswig (Slesvig). This comparatively rural district has approximately 200 025 inhabitants (as of 31 December 2018).

Languages 

The main language of Anglia is German. The peninsula is, however, also part of the language area of Low German (Low Saxon), which is more closely related to English than German is, since it was not affected by the High German consonant shift. 

Danish was the main language of Anglia from the 9th century to the 19th century. The Danish variety indigenous to Anglia was Anglian Danish (Dan. Angeldansk or Angelbomål, Ger. Angeldänisch), a dialect of South Jutlandic (Synnejysk, Dan. Sønderjysk, Ger. Südjütisch or Südjütländisch), the southernmost variety of Danish spoken on the Jutland Peninsula, once spoken as far south as Eckernförde-Borby (Dan. Egernførde or Egernfjord-Borreby) on the Eckernförde Bay (Ger. Eckernförder Bucht, Dan. Egernførde Fjord). In the 19th century, however, a language shift towards Low German occurred.

Danish is still spoken in Anglia by a minority, but in Southern Schleswig Danish dialects, which are not dialects of South Jutlandic, but German-influenced dialects of Standard Danish. The cities with the largest Danish-speaking minorities are Flensburg (Flensborg), Schleswig (Slesvig) and Glücksburg (Lyksborg).

Many Anglian placenames are of Danish origin, including placenames ending in -by ("city"), such as Brodersby-Goltoft, Flensburg-Engelsby (Flensborg-Engelsby), Flensburg-Jürgensby (Flensborg-Jørgensby), Nieby (Nyby); and placenames ending in -rup ("village"), such as Sörup (Sørup), Sterup, Tastrup (Tostrup). There are many placenames of Danish origin in England as well, such as Derby, Rugby or Whitby), but in Danish, German and Swedish -by is pronounced , not  as in England.

North Frisian, one of the Frisian languages that form the group of Anglo-Frisian languages together with English, is spoken in many dialectal variants in neighbouring North Frisia along the North Sea coast of Schleswig-Holstein and on the North Frisian Islands.

History

Early history

The region was home to the Germanic people, the Angles, some of whom, together with Saxons and Jutes, left their homeland to migrate to the island of Great Britain in the 5th and 6th centuries. For the years 449–455, the Anglo-Saxon Chronicle, written around 890, describes how King Vortigern, a British king, invited the Angles to come and receive land in return for helping him defend his realm against marauding Picts. Those successful Angles sent word back that good land was available and that the British were "worthless". A wholesale emigration of Angles and kindred German peoples followed.

The Chronicle, commissioned by King Alfred the Great, drew on earlier oral traditions and on the few written fragments available. The best of these, written around 730, was by the monk Bede, whose history of English Christianity contains the following brief account of the origin and distribution of the Angles:

The phrase "north of the Humber" refers to the northern kingdom of Northumbria, which included most of northern England and part of southern Scotland. Mercia was located in central England and broadly corresponds to the English Midlands.

This account can be related to the evidence of archaeology, notably the distribution of types of fibulae, or brooches, worn by both men and women in antiquity. Eastern and northern Britain were settled by groups wearing cruciform brooches, of the style in fashion at the time in coastal Scandinavia, Denmark, and Schleswig-Holstein south to the lower Elbe and east to the Oder, as well as a pocket in coastal Friesland.

Later history
After the Angles departed from Anglia, by the 8th century the region was occupied by Danes. This is reflected in the large number of place names ending in -by (meaning "city") in the region today. In the 10th century, the chronicler Æthelweard reports that the most important town in Anglia was Hedeby (Ger. Haithabu).

Later Anglia's history is subsumed in that of the larger surrounding region, which came to be known as Southern Jutland or Schleswig (Dan. Slesvig). Until the 19th century the area belonged to Denmark. In terms of ethnic and linguistic heritage the countryside spoke a Danish dialect until the early 1800s after which Low German spread northwards, whereas the towns spoke Low German from the late medieval era. Denmark lost Schleswig to Austria and Prussia in 1864 as a result of the Second Schleswig War. In 1920, following Germany's defeat in the First World War, a plebiscite was held to determine which areas should return to Danish control. As a result of the plebiscite, the northern part of Schleswig returned to Denmark, but Anglia remained in Germany. See Schleswig-Holstein Question for a detailed history.

See also
 Angles
 Anglo-Saxons
 List of Germanic peoples
 Thorsberg moor

Notes

References
 Ecclesiastical History of the English Nation, Book I, Bede, c. 731
 The Anglo-Saxon Chronicle: Translated and collated by Anne Savage, Dorset Press, 1983, 
 Malcolm Falkus and John Gillingham, Historical Atlas of Britain, Crescent Books, 1987,

External links
 Bede, ca 731 A.D., Ecclesiastical History of the English Nation
 Anglo-Saxon Chronicle, ca 890 A.D.
 Angeln cattle
 Tourism in Angeln
 Cinarchea (Archaeological films of Schleswig-Holstein)
 County and Municipal Flags (Schleswig-Holstein, Germany)
 Genealogy in Schleswig-Holstein, Germany

 

Jutland
Peninsulas of Schleswig-Holstein
English language
Regions of Schleswig-Holstein
Anglo-Saxon society